Devon Leigh Logan Polaschek  is a New Zealand professor of psychology and of Crime Science at the University of Waikato in New Zealand who studies high-risk violent offenders in prisons and on parole.

In 2011, she spoke at the University of Otago about recidivism and about the myth that offenders cannot be treated. She also said that psychopaths who had many previous convictions became worse after poorly implemented treatment. However, in 2014 she published an article dispelling the myths about psychopathy and argues that they can be successfully treated using the same methods that are used in the treatment of high risk, high need, and high responsivity offenders. Currently she continues her research at the Violence Prevention Unit Te Whare Manaakitanga, in Wellington's Rimutaka Prison.

In the 2019 Queen's Birthday Honours, Polaschek was appointed a Member of the New Zealand Order of Merit, for services to criminal psychology.

Selected works 
 Ward, Tony, Devon Polaschek, and Anthony R. Beech. Theories of sexual offending. John Wiley & Sons, 2006.
 Skeem, Jennifer L., Devon LL Polaschek, Christopher J. Patrick, and Scott O. Lilienfeld. "Psychopathic personality: Bridging the gap between scientific evidence and public policy." Psychological Science in the Public Interest 12, no. 3 (2011): 95–162.
 Skeem, Jennifer L., Jennifer Eno Louden, Devon Polaschek, and Jacqueline Camp. "Assessing relationship quality in mandated community treatment: Blending care with control." Psychological assessment 19, no. 4 (2007): 397.
 Polaschek, Devon LL, and Tony Ward. "The implicit theories of potential rapists: What our questionnaires tell us." Aggression and violent behavior 7, no. 4 (2002): 385–406.
 Garry, Maryanne, and Devon LL Polaschek. "Imagination and memory." Current Directions in Psychological Science 9, no. 1 (2000): 6–10.

References

External links
 Google Scholar
 Researchgate
 Institutional homepage

Living people
20th-century births
Australian psychologists
Academic staff of the Victoria University of Wellington
Academic staff of the University of Waikato
Members of the New Zealand Order of Merit
Year of birth missing (living people)